Robert Cohu (20 August 1911 – 21 January 2011) was a French basketball player. He competed in the men's tournament at the 1936 Summer Olympics.

References

External links
 

1911 births
2011 deaths
French men's basketball players
Olympic basketball players of France
Basketball players at the 1936 Summer Olympics
Basketball players from Paris
Stade Français basketball players